Habiba Dembélé Sahouet is an Ivorian journalist and television presenter.

She is currently presenter of TV news 13 heures and 20 heures on the La Première (RTI) main channel, centred in Abidjan.

On February 11, 2008, a fire broke out in the studios while she was filming for 20 heures, forcing her to abandon her presenting and flee the building. The fire destroyed several studios but was generally controlled by firefighters.

References

Ivorian journalists
Ivorian television presenters
Living people
Year of birth missing (living people)
Place of birth missing (living people)
People from Abidjan